Antonio Wandscheer (born 31 August 1950) more commonly known as Toninho  or Toninho Wandscheer  is a Brazilian politician and engineer. He has spent his political career representing Paraná, having served as state representative since 2015.

Personal life
Wandscheer was born to Paulo Wandscheer and Maria Koupaka. Prior to becoming a politician Wandscheer worked as an engineer. He is married to Angela Wandscheer and has three sons: Alisson, Marcos, and Tiago. Wandscheer is a Protestant Christian and a member of the evangelical caucus in the legislature, having a strong relationship with the Assembleias de Deus church.

Political career
Wandscheer voted in favor of the impeachment motion of then-president Dilma Rousseff. He would later vote against opening a similar corruption investigation against Rousseff's successor Michel Temer, and voted in favor of the 2017 Brazilian labor reforms.

In 2019 Wandscheer was re-elected the coordinator of the representatives from Paraná in the chamber of deputies.

References

1950 births
Living people
People from Foz do Iguaçu
Republican Party of the Social Order politicians
Brazilian evangelicals
Brazilian engineers
Mayors of places in Brazil
Members of the Chamber of Deputies (Brazil) from Paraná
Members of the Legislative Assembly of Paraná